The 2015–16 season was Sport Lisboa e Benfica's 112th season in existence and the club's 82nd consecutive season in the top flight of Portuguese football. It started on 9 August 2015 and concluded on 20 May 2016.

Benfica played in the Primeira Liga as the two-time defending champions after being crowned for a record 34th time, in the previous campaign. On 15 May, Benfica won their third consecutive league title (for the sixth time in their history and first since 1977), and their 35th overall, with a Portuguese record of 88 points out of the possible maximum of 102 (34 matches). Five days later, Benfica won their third consecutive league cup title, their seventh overall in nine editions, beating Marítimo 6–2 in the final. Internationally, Benfica reached the quarter-finals of the UEFA Champions League, where they were eliminated by Bayern Munich 2–3 on aggregate.

Players

Squad information

Transfers

In

Loan in

Out

Loan out

Technical staff

(B) – Benfica B player

Includes Supertaça Cândido de Oliveira

Goalscorers

Hat-tricks

(H) – Home ; (A) – Away

Assists

Clean sheets
Number of matches inside brackets.

1Includes Supertaça Cândido de Oliveira

* Shared match on Round 34 against Marítimo.

Disciplinary record

Awards

Player

Manager

References

S.L. Benfica seasons
Benfica
Benfica
Portuguese football championship-winning seasons